Stella í framboði is a 2002 Icelandic comedy film written and directed by Guðný Halldórsdóttir. It is a sequel to the 1986 comedy Stella í orlofi and stars Edda Björgvinsdóttir as Stella.

References

External links
 

2002 films
Icelandic comedy films
2000s Icelandic-language films
Films directed by Guðný Halldórsdóttir
2002 comedy films